The Tiny Tim was an American air-to-ground rocket used near the end of the Second World War. It was built in response to a United States Navy requirement for an anti-ship rocket capable of hitting ships from outside of their anti-aircraft range, with a payload capable of sinking heavy shipping. The Tiny Tim was manufactured using 11.75-inch (298 mm) pipe, which was chosen because it was already being manufactured. Used oil field 11.75-inch pipe was acquired for the prototypes.  Also, the 11.75-inch size was of interest in the development because there was already available  a 500-pound semi-armor-piercing bomb that was adaptable for use as the warhead for the rocket. One of  the rocket project scientists commented  on the shortage of the piping “. . . we were reduced for a time to the expedient of salvaging [oil-well casing] from abandoned oil wells.”

Jack Latimer

The Tiny Tim's diameter of 11.75 in (29.8 cm) was the first Allied aerial rocket to have a larger calibre than the Luftwaffe-deployed bomber destroyer aerial rocket ordnance, the Nebelwerfer-based BR 21 of 21 cm (8-1/4 in) calibre. The Tiny Tim's large diameter allowed a sizable 148.5 lb (67.4 kg) semi-armor-piercing high-explosive warhead, some 60 lbs (27 kg) heavier than the BR 21's 40.8 kg (90 lb) warhead. The Tiny Tim had a maximum range of 1,500 meters (1,640 yards), some 200 meters greater than the BR 21's time-fuze limited 1.2 km detonation range from launch.

They were used by the United States Navy and United States Marine Corps near the end of the war during the Battle of Okinawa, and during the Korean War. A problem with the sheer power of the rocket motor causing damage to the firing aircraft was resolved by having the Tiny Tim drop like a bomb, and a lanyard attached to the rocket would snap, causing the rocket to ignite. Common targets included coastal defense guns, bridges, pillboxes, tanks, and shipping. An ambitious operation to use the Tiny Tim against German V-1 sites as part of Operation Crossbow, code-named Project Danny, was planned but cancelled before the squadrons assigned could be deployed to Europe.

Common Tiny Tim delivery aircraft during World War II included the PBJ-1 Mitchell, F4U Corsair, F6F Hellcat, TBM Avenger, and the SB2C Helldiver.

After World War II, the United States Navy's  rocket laboratory at Inyokern, California developed an even larger version of the Tiny Tim, called "Richard", which was 14 inches in diameter and one of the largest air-to-surface unguided rocket ever developed for the US military. While tested, it was never placed in production. The United States Navy also experimented with a version of the Tiny Tim which was a two-stage rocket, with another Tiny Tim rocket motor mounted behind a complete Tiny Tim. Like the Richard, it never moved beyond the research and development stage.

During the second half of the 1940s Tiny Tim also had a short civilian life, when it was modified to be used as a booster for the first U.S. sounding rocket WAC Corporal.

Gallery

See also
Anti-ship missile
Rocket
Wurfrahmen 40
Red Angel

References

pages 97–108 of the China Lake History: History of the Naval Weapons Center, China Lake, California, Volume 2 “The Grand Experiment at Inyokern.’ This book is available for purchase at the China Lake museum gift shop.

Air-to-ground rockets of the United States
World War II weapons of the United States
Weapons and ammunition introduced in 1944